Patrick Leonard ( – 10 May 1944) was an Irish politician, businessman and landowner. He owned three farms near Dublin and was involved in moving cattle between the west of Ireland and Dublin.

In 1915 he was elected President of the Dublin Chamber of Commerce. Leonard was an early pioneer of the car in Ireland. He suffered a serious accident in 1910 when he was injured by an explosion in an acetylene torch which he was using at his home. He was also injured in another accident at home while using explosives to remove a tree trunk in the grounds of his house.  During the 1916 Easter Rising, Leonard, travelling with his son Mark, was told to stop at a road-block by rebels. He refused to do so and was shot at, leading to his son's arm being injured.

After independence, Leonard was elected to Dáil Éireann as a Cumann na nGaedheal Teachta Dála (TD) for the Dublin North constituency at the  Dublin North by-election on 11 March 1925 caused by the resignation of Francis Cahill of Cumann na nGaedheal. He lost his seat at the June 1927 general election but was re-elected at the September 1927 general election. He lost his seat again at the 1932 general election.

He married Emily Mangan, the daughter of Simon Mangan of Dunboyne Castle. They had nine children.

References

External links
 

1860s births
1944 deaths
Cumann na nGaedheal TDs
Members of the 4th Dáil
Members of the 6th Dáil
Politicians from County Dublin